Jerónimo Lloret Pellicer (born 31 August 1955), commonly known as Calsita, is a Spanish retired footballer who played as a forward, and a current manager.

Career
Calsita was born in Alicante, Valencian Community, and was a Real Murcia youth graduate, although he never played for the first team. After spending his first two senior years on loan at Tercera División side AD Hellín, he continued to appear in the same category in the following campaigns, representing CD Badajoz, CD San Fernando, CD Alcoyano and AD Orihuela.

In January 1979 Calsita moved to Vinaròs CF in Segunda División B, but eventually suffered team relegation. In the summer he joined Segunda División club Palencia CF, making his professional debut on 2 September by starting in a 1–1 home draw against Algeciras CF.

After appearing in only four matches, Calsita left the club and subsequently resumed his career in the lower leagues. He retired in 1986, aged 31, with Villajoyosa CF.

After his retirement Calsita started working as a manager, notably coaching Benidorm CF in the third tier, CD Alcoyano and UCAM Murcia CF (two stints).

Personal life
Calsita's father, José and having the same nickname, was also a footballer. A forward, he represented Hércules CF, Atlético Madrid and Real Murcia professionally.

References

External links

1955 births
Living people
People from Alicante
Spanish footballers
Footballers from the Valencian Community
Association football forwards
Segunda División players
Segunda División B players
Tercera División players
Real Murcia players
CD Badajoz players
CD San Fernando players
CD Alcoyano footballers
CD Puertollano footballers
Real Avilés CF footballers
Spanish football managers
CD Alcoyano managers
UCAM Murcia CF managers